Pinkasim were books or journals which were used to coordinate and document organizations in Jewish towns and villages during the early modern period in Europe.

References
Dean Phillip Bell, Jewish identity in early modern Germany: memory, power and community pp. 45–46
http://www.proquest.com/products-services/Pinkasim.html(Archive)

Jewish literature
History of the Jews in Europe
Early Modern period